Tyler John Polak (born May 13, 1992 in Lincoln, Nebraska) is an American soccer player who currently plays for Greenville Triumph in USL League One.

Career

Club
Polak was born in Lincoln, Nebraska and attended Creighton University for three semesters before being drafted 22nd overall in the 2012 MLS SuperDraft by New England. He was a member of the 2012 Generation adidas program. While at Creighton he also played for Chicago Fire Premier in the USL Premier Development League.

Polak made his debut with New England on March 10, 2012, appearing in the season opening match against San Jose Earthquakes.

On March 27, 2013, Polak was loaned to New England's USL Pro affiliate club Rochester Rhinos. He was released following the 2013 season.

Polak joined Minnesota United FC of the North American Soccer League ahead of the 2014 season.

After two years with Minnesota, Polak signed with FC Cincinnati in the United Soccer League ahead of their inaugural 2016 season. At the end of the 2017 season, FC Cincinnati announced that Polak's contract had expired and would not be renewed for 2018.

After spending time with National Premier Soccer League side Miami FC 2, Polak joined USL club Saint Louis FC on August 15, 2018.

Polak was announced as the first signing for Greenville Triumph SC in USL League One on January 4, 2019.

International
Polak has represented the United States at the under-17 and under-20 levels. He played for the United States at the 2009 FIFA U-17 World Cup in Nigeria.

References

External links

 
 
 

1992 births
Living people
American soccer players
Creighton Bluejays men's soccer players
Chicago Fire U-23 players
New England Revolution players
Rochester New York FC players
Minnesota United FC (2010–2016) players
Association football defenders
Soccer players from Nebraska
Sportspeople from Lincoln, Nebraska
New England Revolution draft picks
USL League Two players
Major League Soccer players
USL Championship players
North American Soccer League players
United States men's youth international soccer players
United States men's under-20 international soccer players
FC Cincinnati (2016–18) players
Miami FC players
Saint Louis FC players
Greenville Triumph SC players
USL League One players